Kirimi P. Kaberia is currently the Principal Secretary, Ministry of Sports in Kenya. He was the Principal Secretary, Ministry of Defence in Kenya up to April 2017.

Previously, he was Kenya's Ambassador to Brazil, Argentina, Chile, Colombia and Venezuela. He has served in the Kenyan Embassies in Madrid  and France as a Counsellor and Head of Chancery and also served in the Kenya embassy in Washington DC. He is a Kenyan former journalist and community organizer.

In the 1990s, Kaberia worked for the BBC in Africa and covered the Somali war. He later joined the Washington Times as a reporter. Kaberia became President of the African Unification Front in 2001. In October 2003 he joined the diplomatic service in Kenya and was posted as Kenya's Senior Diplomatic Councillor to the United States. Kaberia has worked at the Less Aspin Center as the director for international programs from 1995 to 2002 after which he moved home back to Kenya and joined the foreign service.

Background 

Kaberia is the founder of the US-based Democracy and Governance Program, which has trained over 500 African leaders, including cabinet ministers and members of parliament from across Africa, as well as government and civil society leaders in Africa since 1994. In 2011 he received the prestigious founder's award for the work done and the founding of this program. He was honoured together with Senator Richard Durban of Illinois.

Kirimi was educated at Daystar University in Kenya then to Marquette university in the United States and Instituto Superior de derecho y Economia (ISDE) in Spain. He holds BA in Communications and an LLM in international Relations.

In the 1990s Kaberia worked for the BBC in Kenya, and did assignments that included covering the war in Somalia. He has worked with the Washington Post and the Washington Times as a staff reporter, and with the Les Aspin Center at Marquette University in Washington, D.C., as director for international relations.

Kaberia has longstanding working relations with the US Congressional Black Caucus, and the US Foreign Relations Committee. Amb. Kirimi is also the CEO of ATCnet, the African Trade Consultants Network a group he founded with Peter Burgess in New York  and Washington, D.C. He has written widely on Africa and international political economy as it affects Africa, and has been involved in peace efforts across Africa, and has been instrumental in the movement to reform the way that aid agencies operate in Africa.

Kaberia has started a chain of Libraries in his rural Mountain Community of Maua and has his network of friends joining in to develop these libraries into centers of excellence.

Kaberia is also known to sponsor a lot of young people from Kenya to undergo education in the USA, Malaysia, India, China and Australia. This has enabled him to transform the lives of many young people as they are able to have the knowledge and necessary skills to be independent. He is also known to be a famous collector of matroshki.

Kaberia is an avid naturalist and is reported to have planted over 3.5 million trees in the Timau area of Mt Kenya Forest in Meru County.

References 

He is a God fearing person

Living people
Kenyan diplomats
Kenyan journalists
Ambassadors of Kenya to Brazil
Year of birth missing (living people)